Lewiston is an extinct community in Sciota Township in Dakota County, Minnesota, United States. 

The community lies northeast of Northfield, and is nearest to the small city of Randolph. A town once larger than nearby Northfield; gone in only fifteen years, but this town set near the Cannon River and Alta Avenue was home to many Minnesotan politicians, such as Edward J. Thye, Minnesota's governor; Pierce Butler became a United States Supreme Court justice, and Loren W. Collins was a Minnesota Supreme Court justice. A flourishing town with a horseracing track and a hotel was the home of these political figures. From 1851 to 1866, a magnificent town stood where farmland is today. A good pitstop between Hastings and Faribault is all that remains of the now abandoned town is the 1860 schoolhouse turned Sciota township hall.

References

Former populated places in Dakota County, Minnesota
Former populated places in Minnesota